Paulo Isidoro de Jesus (born 3 August 1953), known as Paulo Isidoro, is a Brazilian former association footballer who played as an offensive midfielder.

In 1981, he received the Bola de Ouro award. He was capped 41 times with the Brazil national team between June 1977 and July 1983, and played in four out of the team's five matches at the 1982 FIFA World Cup, always as a substitute (usually for Serginho Chulapa).

Clubs
1975–1980 : Clube Atlético Mineiro
1980–1983 : Grêmio Foot-Ball Porto Alegrense
1983–1985 : Santos FC
1985–1988 : Guarani Futebol Clube
1989–1989 : Esporte Clube XV de Jaú
1989–1990 : Cruzeiro Esporte Clube
1991–1992 : Associação Atlética Internacional (Limeira)
1992–1997 : Valeriodoce Esporte Clube

Honours

Club
Clube Atlético Mineiro
Campeonato Mineiro (Championship Minas Gerais State championship): 1976, 1978, 1979

Cruzeiro Esporte Clube
Campeonato Mineiro (Championship Minas Gerais State championship): 1990

Grêmio Foot-Ball Porto Alegrense
Campeonato Gaúcho (Rio Grande do Sul State Championship): 1980
Campeonato Brasileiro Série A (Brazilian championship): 1981

Santos FC
Campeonato Paulista (São Paulo State Championship): 1984

Individual
Brazilian Golden Ball: 1981
Brazilian Silver Ball: 1976, 1981, 1983

References

1953 births
Living people
Footballers from Belo Horizonte
Brazilian footballers
Campeonato Brasileiro Série A players
Clube Atlético Mineiro players
Grêmio Foot-Ball Porto Alegrense players
Guarani FC players
Santos FC players
Esporte Clube XV de Novembro (Jaú) players
Cruzeiro Esporte Clube players
Associação Atlética Internacional (Limeira) players
1982 FIFA World Cup players
Brazil international footballers
Association football midfielders